Kris Law, born Chin Chiang (or KLCC) is an internationally and critically acclaimed film actor of Chinese and Thai descent from Malaysia. Law gained global prominence when he became the first ASEAN Actor to debut in India – starring with Academy Award nominated Bollywood Actor Aamir Khan in the Incredible India ad campaign. In Malaysia, Law was most known for his breakthrough role named Christien, being the first openly gay character on Malaysian media and primetime TV broadcasting drama series Ampang Medikal. Law has appeared in Malaysian, Singaporean, Bollywood and Hong Kong films including "Anak Mami Kembali", 1957: Hati Malaya and A House of Happiness which combinedly grossed over RM 900 million in box-office with over 20 international TV commercials.

Background and education

Born in George Town, Penang, Malaysia), to a Singaporean doctor father and Malaysian mother, Law was the rightful heir to his father's vast fortune in Singapore. After suddenly losing his father in a tragic car accident at the age of 3, Law was denied his inheritance in a lawsuit against his father's first family due to the illegitimacy of his birth where he was born out of wedlock. As a poor and orphaned child, Law first appeared on stage at the age of 10 playing the lead role Dick in Dick Whittington and his Cat for The International School of Penang (Uplands). Later, he joined the Penang Free School Christian and Drama Society and acted in many plays as the lead. In 1996, Law was selected to be in the first pioneering batch of TV3 Academy, Kuala Lumpur majoring in the field of Broadcasting. During his tenure at the academy, he was selected to be in the panel of distinguished juries to judge in the Anugerah Skrin and Anugerah Juara Lagu awards. Law was the youngest and the only non-Malay jury member in the panel. Later, Law transferred his studies and graduated in Limkokwing University of Creative Technology, London with major in Business Communication in 1999.

In Kuala Lumpur, he started his career in the creative industry as a copywriter in Leo Burnett in 2000, working under film director Yasmin Ahmad. According to Yasmin, the reasons Law got the position were because of his auspicious full name initials KLCC, royalty bloodline and same birthday with Giorgio Armani and Malaysian Prime Minister Mahathir Mohamad.

Early career
In 2004, Law received his first major media spotlight when he competed in the reality TV competition show Malaysian Idol. Law performed in yellow shorts when other contestants wore normal clothes got him onto the front page of all national newspapers. His yellow shorts performance video went viral in the Internet to the tune of 100 million viewers worldwide, making him the world's first person to become a viral video star celebrity spearheading the term "instant fame" and social media long before the establishment of social media like it is today. Law's yellow shorts became an iconic fashion statement, cultural phenomenon and frenzy among the youths when the viral video debuted, entering into pop culture lexicon. Numerous and popular references were made about his "sexy shorts" in politics, fashion, academia and eventually identified by many as a form of contemporary performance art first done on prime time TV, thus making him a cultural provocateur with a clear social zeitgeist against the racial, government-controlled media and race-segregated Malaysian society.

In 2005, Law competed again in Malaysian Idol season 2. More offers to star in other reality TV shows followed due to highest TV viewers ratings success of his yellow shorts performance. Law won the Most Favourite Contestant title for the Gillette Vector Challenge and was a finalist on Malaysian Top Host.
 Law was the only competitive reality TV star to appear in 3 different reality TV show genres in one year. In a 2005 radio interview, Law already foreseen the dangers of social media when he expressed the reasons he limited his presence away from it was due to the amount of haters present and its manipulative nature that doesn't bring any credibility.

As an Actor, Law appeared in Anak Mami Kembali (2005) directed by Abdul Razak Mohaideen. In his next big screen role, he played a communist in the film 1957: Hati Malaya (2007) directed by Shuhaimi Baba. Law's portrayal of the communist in 1957: Hati Malaya was censored.

Awards

Kris Law is the first-ever Malaysian actor to play and portray a gay person character in the Malaysian media during prime time, on an episode of the TV drama serial Ampang Medikal which aired in 2008 – homosexuality was and still is illegal and punishable by law in Malaysia. Law's portrayal of the homosexual character was the first realistic, non-stereotypical and most identifiable to the average LGBT Malaysian.

Law's main starring role in the film Talent House (2012) was awarded Best Actor by BMW.

Law's most successful TV commercial was "KFC Black Pepper Chicken", which was aired during the peak of the World Cup 2010. Law's talent as a commercial actor has taken him around the world with his most recent and popular market commercial to date being produced for the Indian Ministry of Tourism's Incredible India! thematic ad campaign titled Atithi Devo Bhav with Aamir Khan in 2015 – making him the first ASEAN commercial actor to debut in the world's biggest market in cinema and TV advertising viewing audience where mobile Internet penetration is still low.

 Law is also a model, having posed for a poster calendar which was shot in Bangkok, Thailand (2006). Law was later chosen by French photographer Françoise Huguier to model for her worldwide photo collection debut in New York, Paris, London and other major cities of the world under the Vertical/Horizontal series (2012–2013) which won the Paris Beaux-Arts Academy Photography Prize.

Law hopes to continue his work as an actor that champions equal human rights for everyone, regardless of their race, sexuality, religion or background; and to give a voice to youth who are discontent over racial bias in their country.

Filmography

References

External links

Living people
1978 births
Malaysian male actors
Malaysian people of Chinese descent
Malaysian people of Singaporean descent
Chinese male film actors
21st-century Chinese male actors
People from Penang
Malaysian Idol participants